Maria Novosiltseva (1830-1910), was a Russian Empire pedagogue. She was the principal of the Smolny Institute in Saint Petersburg in 1886–1895.

She was the daughter of noble Peter Kozhin and married the estate owner Ivan Novosiltsev (1823-1870) in 1847. She was appointed principal by Maria Feodorovna (Dagmar of Denmark) after her effort as a nurse during the Russo-Turkish War (1877–1878). She lacked education and changed nothing in the institute at the educational level, but she reformed the medical care at the institute and was described as popular and considerate.

References

 Императорское воспитательное общество благородных девиц 1764–1914. Т.2. — Петроград, 1915. — 662 с

1830 births
1910 deaths
19th-century educators from the Russian Empire
Educators from the Russian Empire
Nobility from the Russian Empire
Russian people of the Russo-Turkish War (1877–1878)